Chahuiyeh (also Romanized as Chāhūīyeh and Chāhūyeh; also known as Pangū‘īyeh) is a village in Jorjafak Rural District, in the Central District of Zarand County, Kerman Province, Iran. At the 2006 census, its population was 19, in 6 families.

References 

Populated places in Zarand County